James Blond may refer to:
 James Bond
 Daniel Craig, the first blond actor to play James Bond